Thomas Sotherton (by 1525 – 1583), of Norwich, Norfolk, was an English politician.

He was a Member of Parliament (MP) for Norwich in 1558 and 1559 and mayor of the city in 1565-66.

He was the eldest son of Nicholas Sotherton (d.1540) of Norwich by Agnes Wright. He married Elizabeth, daughter of Augustine Steward of Norwich. They had four sons and four daughters.

Children

Children of Thomas Sotherton and Elizabeth Steward:

 Augustine Sotherton of Hesleden (Hellesdon) near Norwich, m. Anne, daughter of Thomas Peck of Norwich, and had: 
 Samwell Sotheron of Hesleden, m. Mary, daughter of Thomas Gilbert of Burlingham in Norfolk, and had Thomas, who ob. s.p, Gilbert and Anne
 Thomas
 Elias
 Elizabeth, the wife of Thomas Warner of Hofton (Hoveton) in Norfolk
 Nicholas
 Thomas
 Susan
 Matthew
 Judith, the wife of Thomas Ferreby of Norfolk
 Elizabeth, ob.
 Mary, the wife of Henry Barker of Norwich

References

1583 deaths
Members of the Parliament of England for Norfolk
Mayors of Norwich
English MPs 1558
Year of birth uncertain
English MPs 1559